Naftali Mountains is a mountain range between Lebanon and Upper Galilee, Israel. 
The western side gradually changes into the highlands of southern Lebanon. The eastern side sharply descends into the Hula Valley of Israel.

They are a part of the watershed between the basins of the Mediterranean Sea and the Jordan River.

The area was the place of heavy fighting in 1948 during  the Israel War of Independence.

Israeli populated places in the mountains (from north to south) are: Misgav Am, Margaliot, Manara, Ramot Naftali, Malkia, Avivim, Dishon.

References

External links
Naftali Mountains Forest in the Golan Heights

Mountains of Israel
Upper Galilee